The music of the Streets of Rage series of beat 'em up games, released in the early 1990s, was produced by Yuzo Koshiro.

The soundtracks mainly consist of electronic dance music encompassing genres such as electro, house, techno, hardcore, jungle, ambient, breakbeat, gabber, noise, and trance. The music was produced using the Yamaha FM-synth sound chips of the Sega Mega Drive video game console (YM2612) and NEC PC-88 computer (YM2608), along with Koshiro's own audio programming language "Music Love," a modified version of the PC-88's Music Macro Language (MML).

The soundtracks have been cited as being ahead of their time and as some of the best in video games.  The soundtracks have influenced a range of chiptune, electronica, grime and dubstep musicians through to the present day, including artists such as Ikonika, BT, Labrinth, Martyn, Joker, Darkstar, Childish Gambino, and Danger.

Streets of Rage

When Streets of Rage'''s development began in 1990, Koshiro was influenced by electronic dance music, or club music, specifically techno and house music, and wanted to be the first to introduce those sounds to chiptune and video game music. Many tracks also have a warm, Caribbean quality, and the soundtrack shows the influence of contemporary R&B and hip hop music; Yuzo Koshiro said that he was influenced by black music, which was growing together with house and techno, so he "naturally began to think about taking them all in." He was particularly influenced by "the swinging rhythms that characterized breakbeats," especially the "ground beat" (used in Soul II Soul's "Keep On Movin'" in 1988 and Enigma's "Sadeness (Part I)" in 1989) which inspired "The Street of Rage" title track.  Other artists who influenced him include Black Box, Maxi Priest and Caron Wheeler around the time of composing.

The soundtracks for the Streets of Rage series were composed using then outdated PC-88 hardware alongside Koshiro's own original audio programming language. According to Koshiro: "For Bare Knuckle I used the PC88 and an original programming language I developed myself. The original was called MML, Music Macro Language. It's based on NEC's BASIC program, but I modified it heavily. It was more a BASIC-style language at first, but I modified it to be something more like Assembly. I called it ‘Music Love'. I used it for all the Bare Knuckle Games."

Streets of Rage 3

The music style of Streets of Rage 3 has a different feel to that of the first two games. Described by Yuzo Koshiro as "fast-beat techno like jungle," it was composed using his own "Automated Composing System," used to produce heavily randomized sequences. The soundtrack also had elements of abstract, experimental, gabber, and trance music. As with Streets of Rage 2, the soundtrack features tracks composed by both Koshiro and Motohiro Kawashima.

Unlike the first two soundtracks, the tracks are not in the order that they appear in-game. The full title of this CD is Bare Knuckle 3: Iron Fist Scriptures. The disc itself is difficult to find today.

For the soundtrack to Streets of Rage 3, Koshiro created a new composition method called the "Automated Composing System" to produce "fast-beat techno like jungle." It was the most advanced techno technique of the time, incorporating heavily randomized sequences. This resulted in innovative and experimental sounds generated automatically that, according to Koshiro, "you ordinarily never could imagine on your own." This method was very rare at the time, but has since become popular among techno and trance producers to get "unexpected and odd sounds."

The game's experimental, abrasive noise-based, electronic music received a mixed reception upon release, but has since been considered to be ahead of its time. According to Mean Machines, the "music takes some getting used to – ironically it pre-dated the 'trance' era that came a short while after release." The experimental sounds and use of heavily randomized sequences are also considered ahead of its time.

Streets of Rage 4Streets of Rage 4, developed by Dotemu, Lizardcube, and Guard Crush Games, was composed by Olivier Deriviere, with additional compositions from Yuzo Koshiro, Motohiro Kawashima, Yoko Shimomura, Keiji Yamagishi, Harumi Fujita, Das Mörtal, XL Middleton, Scattle and Groundislava. The soundtrack is structured so that Deriviere wrote the primary themes, while each boss fight's theme was written by one of the guest composers. Koshiro was not a part of the project from the start, but joined in June 2019 after playing a demo of the game at BitSummit, an indie game showcase in Japan. He cited fan requests and how the game was coming along as reasons for joining. Hideki Naganuma was also originally set to contribute, but dropped out of the project due to scheduling conflicts and was replaced by Fujita.

The soundtrack of the DLC Streets of Rage 4: Mr. X Nightmare'' released on July 15, 2021 was fully composed by Tee Lopes.

The soundtrack was released digitally by Mutant Ninja Records and physically Brave Wave Productions alongside the game's release on April 30, 2020. A limited vinyl disc print was also released by Limited Run Games.

References

Streets of Rage
Video game soundtracks
Video game music discographies